This is the progression of world record improvements of the 10000 metres M50 division of Masters athletics.

Key

References

Masters Athletics 10000 m list

Masters athletics world record progressions